The Ghiasieh School (Persian: مدرسه غیاثیه) or the Khargerd School (Persian: مدرسه خرگرد) is a historical Madrasa in Khargerd, Iran.

History 
It was built in 1444 during the reign of Shahrukh Timurid by the order of his vizier, Sheikh Ahmad Khafi. The structure is made of bricks, and consists of 4 Iwans, 8 classrooms and 32 chambers used for students to rest in.

It was listed among the Iranian National heritage sites with the number 126 in 1932.

References 

Buildings and structures in Razavi Khorasan Province
Khaf County
Timurid Empire
15th century in Iran
National works of Iran